The Senegalese ladyfish (Elops senegalensis) is a species of ray-finned fish in the family Elopidae, and is native to the coastal waters of the eastern Atlantic Ocean from Mauritania to the Democratic Republic of the Congo. It is often confused with the West African ladyfish, Elops lacerta, and can be distinguished only by the number of gill rakers on the lower part of the first gill arc, and the number of scales on the lateral line.

The Senegalese ladyfish grows to a maximum total length of 90 cm and a maximum weight of 5.9 kg.

Threats 
This species uses estuarine areas and hypersaline lagoons; changes in the quality of these habitats may affect this species' population dynamics.  Although this species may not be closely associated with any single habitat, it may be adversely affected by development and urbanization.

References

Senegalese ladyfish
Fish of West Africa
Marine fauna of West Africa
Senegalese ladyfish